This is the list of the Chief Justices of Lahore High Court.

List of Justices of Lahore High Court

These are the names of the Judges of the Lahore High court...

List of Chief Justices of Lahore High Court 

These are the names of the Chief Justices of the Lahore High Court.

Lists of Pakistani people
Law-related lists